ADSB-FUB-187 is an indazole-based synthetic cannabinoid. It is a potent agonist of the CB1 receptor with a binding affinity of Ki = 0.09 nM and an EC50 of 1.09 nM. It was originally developed by Pfizer in 2009, being example 187 from patent WO 2009/106982. While it is the most tightly binding compound from this patent in terms of Ki, it is not the most potent compound at producing a CB1 mediated pharmacological effect, with at least 17 other compounds from the patent having lower EC50 values.

Legality
Sweden's public health agency suggested classifying ADSB-FUB-187 as hazardous substance on November 10, 2014, following its use as an ingredient in grey-market synthetic cannabis products.

See also
 AB-FUBINACA
 ADB-FUBINACA

References

Cannabinoids
Designer drugs
Indazolecarboxamides
Fluoroarenes